The Anmatjere Community, or Anmatyere Council, was a former local government area in the Northern Territory of Australia whose seat was located in the town of Ti-Tree, Northern Territory, located approximately  north of Alice Springs. The Stuart Highway runs through the centre of Ti Tree.

On 1 July 2008, the area covered by the Anmatyere council was merged into the Central Desert Shire, and the Council ceased to exist.

Facilities
 Anmatjere Knowledge Centre and Library
 Redsand Art Gallery - which includes an Aboriginal Art centre and a cafe
 Ti Tree Roadhouse - which includes a bar, motel, camping and backpacker accommodation
 Ti Tree School
 Police Station
 Sports oval
 Health Clinic
 Aged Care Centre

Areas of Governance
 Alyuen (on Aileron Station)
 Anyungunba (on Pine Hill Station)
 Engawala (on Alcoota Station)
 Laramba (on Napperby Station)
 Nturiya (the western part of Ti-Tree Station)
 Pmara Jutunta (the central part of Ti-Tree Station)
 Ti-Tree (the Town of Ti-Tree)
 Wilora (on Stirling Station)
 Woolla (Adelaide Bore and the eastern part of Ti-Tree Station)
 Yanginj (on Anningie Station)

See also 
Anmatjere, Northern Territory

References

Former local government areas of the Northern Territory
Aboriginal communities in the Northern Territory
2008 disestablishments in Australia